Teyr can refer to:

Teyr, the number 3 in
Cornish
Cumbrian dialect
Brythonic Celtic languages used by shepherds in Northern England

See also
 Tyr (disambiguation)